Pekka Varis (born 1972) is a Finnish ski-orienteering competitor. He won a silver medal in the long distance at the 1998 World Ski Orienteering Championships. He placed second in the overall World Cup in 1997.

See also
 List of orienteers
 List of orienteering events

References

Finnish orienteers
Male orienteers
Ski-orienteers
1972 births
Living people